1 Percent of Friendship is a South Korean reality show distributed by KBS2 airs on Saturdays. Originally having been just a Chuseok show, it became a permanent weekly show after favourable reviews of its pilot episode.

Broadcast timeline

Format
The reality show explores relationship dynamics and developments by looking at how two people with opposite personalities interact and build friendship.

Host 

 Bae Cheol-soo
 Ahn Jung-hwan
 Kim Hee-chul
 Bae Jeong-nam (Episode 10-14)
 Jung Hyung-don (Episode Pilot)

List of episodes

Rating
In the ratings below, the highest rating for the show will be in red, and the lowest rating for the show will be in blue each year.

Awards and nominations

References

External links
  
 

2018 South Korean television series debuts
2018 South Korean television series endings
Korean-language television shows
Korean Broadcasting System original programming
South Korean variety television shows